Chilbolten Down is a hamlet in the civil parish of Chilbolton  in Hampshire, England. Its nearest town is Stockbridge, which lies approximately 3.4 miles (5.5 km) south-west from the hamlet.

Villages in Hampshire
Test Valley